Erandol Lok Sabha constituency was a Lok Sabha (parliamentary) constituency of Maharashtra state in western India. This constituency was dissolved when the "Delimitation of Parliamentary and Assembly Constituencies Order, 2008", based on the recommendations of the Delimitation Commission in 2002 was implemented in February 2008.

Assembly segments
Erandol Lok Sabha constituency comprised the following six Vidhan Sabha segments:
 Chalisgaon
 Parola
 Amalner
 Chopda
 Erandol
 Pachora

Members of Lok Sabha

^ by-poll

See also
 Raver Lok Sabha constituency
 List of former constituencies of the Lok Sabha

Former Lok Sabha constituencies of Maharashtra
Former constituencies of the Lok Sabha
2008 disestablishments in India
Constituencies disestablished in 2008